Albinaria ariadne is a species of air-breathing land snail, a terrestrial pulmonate gastropod mollusk in the family Clausiliidae, the door snails. The species is endemic to Crete.

It has been stated that further research is necessary whether Albinaria ariadne is an independent species. Based on shell characters it seems closely related to Albinaria idaea, except that Albinaria ariadne has a weak basalis.

Distribution
This species occurs in Greece. It is only known from a local occurrence near Orthés (S of Perama) in northern central Crete.

References

External links 

 AnimalBase :: Albinaria ariadne species homepage

Albinaria
Gastropods described in 1991
Endemic fauna of Crete
Molluscs of Europe